Noviembre is a 2003 Spanish film about a guerrilla street theater troupe presented as a retrospective false documentary, directed by Achero Mañas.

The film focuses on the relationship between spectators and performers, the commercialization of art, and the revolutionary potential of theatre.

It was nominated for nine awards at several film festivals, including three at the 2003 Goya Awards.

Plot
Impelled by a spirit which still preserves a patina of idealism, Alfredo arrives in Madrid intent on creating "a performance which is more free, straight from the heart, capable of making people feel alive". His concept of what theater should be begins beyond the stage, out in the streets face to face with the public.

Outdoors, in any town square, in a park or in the city's most commercial street, Alfredo and his troupe NOVEMBER start the show: demons to provoke passers-by, displays of social conscience, actions taken to the extreme to put the forces of law and order on full alert. There are no limits, no censorship; only ideas which are always valid so long as the public ceases to be the public and becomes part of the show swept by surprise, fear, tears or laughter.

Cast

See also 
 List of Spanish films of 2003

References

External links
 

2003 films
2000s Spanish-language films
Madrid in fiction
Spain in fiction
Films directed by Achero Mañas
2000s Spanish films